George Wise may refer to:

 George Wise (Australian politician) (1853–1950), Australian politician and solicitor
 George Wise (rugby union) (1904–1971), New Zealand rugby union player
 George D. Wise (general) (1816–1881), Union Army officer during the American Civil War
 George D. Wise (politician) (1831–1898), U.S. Representative from Virginia
 George S. Wise (1906–1987), American Jewish sociologist